Greenwood Baptist Church (GBC) is an historic Baptist church located in the Park Slope neighborhood of Brooklyn, New York. The congregation was begun as a prayer meeting mission by Reverend Henry Bromley of Strong Place Baptist Church in 1856 and was incorporated as an independent church on September 28, 1858. The current church building was erected in 1900 and is located at 461 6th Street, Brooklyn, NY 11215 at the corner of 7th Avenue.  Designed by Adolph Leicht, the Gothic Revival building was listed on the National Register of Historic Places for its architecture in 2016.

Affiliations
Greenwood Baptist Church is affiliated with American Baptist Churches of Metropolitan New York (ABCMNY) and the  American Baptist Churches USA (ABCUSA).

References 

Churches in Brooklyn
Baptist churches in New York (state)
Churches on the National Register of Historic Places in New York (state)
National Register of Historic Places in Brooklyn